New Rose Hotel is a 1998 American cyberpunk erotic drama film co-written and directed by Abel Ferrara and starring Christopher Walken, Willem Dafoe and Asia Argento. It is based on William Gibson's story of the same name.

Plot
Fox (Walken) and X (Dafoe) are Tokyo based corporate extraction specialists, half headhunters, half kidnappers, who specialize in helping R&D scientists relocate from corporations who would rather see them dead than working for their competitors. Fox is obsessed with one Hiroshi (Yoshitaka Amano ) a paradigm-shattering super-genius who is currently working for Maas, the corporation who crippled him. To that end, Fox and X employ Sandii (Argento), a "Shinjuku-girl", or small-time hustler/call girl, to help "persuade" Hiroshi to defect to Hosaka, another corporation to which Fox is somewhat warmer. Fox is responsible for brokering the deal with Hosaka, Sandii for getting Hiroshi to fall in love with her and defect to a Hosaka lab in Marrakech, and X is responsible for teaching Sandii how to make Hiroshi melt. Sandii disappears, Fox commits suicide, and X retreats to the safest place he knows, the New Rose Hotel, a derelict capsule hotel.

Cast
Christopher Walken as Fox
Willem Dafoe as X
Asia Argento as Sandii
Annabella Sciorra as Madame Rosa
John Lurie as Distinguished Man
Kimmy Suzuki as Asian Girl #1
Miou as Asian Girl #2
Yoshitaka Amano as Hiroshi
Gretchen Mol as Hiroshi's Wife
Ryuichi Sakamoto as Hosaka Executive

Production
Edward R. Pressman had owned the film rights to New Rose Hotel since the late 1980s.  Before Ferrara got involved, Kathryn Bigelow was originally set to direct.

Zoë Tamerlis Lund wrote the first draft of the script in 1996.

According to Ferrara, both Virginie Ledoyen and Chloë Sevigny were considered for the role of Sandii.  Ferrara also claims that Arnold Schwarzenegger was considered for the role of Fox.

Asia Argento made a documentary about Ferrara, titled Abel/Asia (1998), during the making of the film.

Ferrara said he fired a lot of the crew members of the film; some of them were longtime collaborators of Ferrara's, such as film composer Joe Delia.

Release
The film opened October 1, 1999 at the Cinema Village Triplex in New York City and grossed $5,147 in its opening weekend and $21,521 in total.

Reception 
On Rotten Tomatoes, the film has an approval rating of 19%, based on 16 reviews, with an average rating of 4.20/10. On Metacritic, the film has a weighted average score of 31 out of 100, based on 9 critics, indicating "generally unfavorable reviews".

References

External links
 
 
 
 Abel Ferrara on the making of the film on YouTube

1990s science fiction thriller films
1998 films
American science fiction thriller films
Cyberpunk films
American erotic thriller films
Films based on short fiction
Films directed by Abel Ferrara
William Gibson
1990s science fiction films
1990s English-language films
1990s American films